Juan Agustín Augier or Juan Agustía Segundo Augier Correa Soria Medrano (1819–1892) was an Argentine politician.

Argentine politicians
1819 births
1892 deaths